The World/Inferno Friendship Society (also referred to as World Inferno, or Inferno) was an American band from Brooklyn, New York. Its style merged punk, soul, klezmer and jazz, while its collective membership featured horns, piano and guitar and had a membership of about 40 players, of whom only about seven to ten active members usually performed at a time. The group was led by singer Jack Terricloth, who was the only constant during the group's history. Terricloth was known for his pointed commentary during shows; his monologues touched on politics and his transformation from the "old school."

Its lyrics often concerned historical or biographical subjects, such as Weimar-era Germany, Peter Lorre, Jeffrey Lee Pierce of The Gun Club, Paul Robeson, Leni Riefenstahl, Dante Alighieri, Philip K. Dick, and Jonathan Fire*Eater.

While over 40 Society members have come and gone, Terricloth maintained that the group was "always meant to be this way," and were more of a gang than an actual band. Many members continued to collaborate with the group, but do not join them on tour.

Bandleader Jack Terricloth died in May 2021; no information on the future of the World/Inferno Friendship Society has been released following his death.

Hallowmas
The World/Inferno Friendship Society's annual Halloween show, Hallowmas, was its most-anticipated performance of the year. The event was known for its elaborate planning and surprises. Past Hallowmases have included a burning effigy of Mr. Terricloth constructed and set alight by a large, caustic cat; an ethereal string quartet performing throughout the evening in the rear of the hall; circus performances and fire breathing by the Odd Child Uprising troupe and a cadaverous marching band materializing on stage for the finale, "Pumpkin Time". The song (performed only at Hallowmas shows) includes street rallies, and references The Great Pumpkin from the Peanuts comic strip.

Members

Discography

Albums

The True Story of the Bridgewater Astral League – 1997
Just the Best Party – 2002
Red-Eyed Soul – 2006
Addicted to Bad Ideas: Peter Lorre's Twentieth Century – 2007
The Anarchy and the Ecstasy – 2011
This Packed Funeral – 2014
All Borders Are Porous to Cats – 2020

Live/Compilation albums
East Coast Super Sound Punk of Today! (compilation) – 2000
Hallowmas: Live at Northsix – 2003

Singles
"Tattoos Fade" b/w "Nothing You Begin" –1994, Blue Ghost Records ("Tattoos Fade" was re-released on the East Coast Super Sound Punk of Today! compilation)
"The Models and the Mannequins" b/w "Glamour Ghouls" – 1996, Gern Blandsten Records (both re-released on the East Coast Super Sound Punk of Today! compilation)
"Our Candidate" b/w "All Of California And Everyone Who Lives There Stinks" – 1996, Gern Blandsten (both re-released on the East Coast Super Sound Punk of Today! compilation)
"Pumpkin Time" b/w "Ich Errinere Mich An Weimar" – 1999, Gern Blandsten (both re-released on the East Coast Super Sound Punk of Today! compilation)
"I Wouldn't Want to Live in a World without Grudges" b/w "All the World is a Stage (Dive)" – 2000, X-Mist Records (both re-recorded for Just the Best Party)
"Hallowmas 2010" – 2010, Chunksaah Records (7″ disc distributed at Hallowmas 2010, featuring "Canonize Philip K. Dick, OK")
"This Packed Funeral" – 2013
"Freedom is a Wilderness Made for You and Me" – 2019
"All I Can Do To Help You With Your Nightmares is Keep You Up Late" – 2019

EPs
International Smashism! – 2001
Speak of Brave Men – 2004
Me v. Angry Mob – 2005
Vox Inferne – 2010
Maps, Saints, & Just This Side of Way Too Much (live, 2 songs from "The Anarchy and The Ectasy") – 2012 
Turnstile Comix #2 (three song EP released with a comic book) – 2013

Unreleased demos
A Demonstrational Introduction To The Astral Plane – 1996–1997
Powder Waves Goodbye Sessions – 2000
A Lexicon of Friends & Enemies – 2004
The New Americana Demos – 2008
3 Ring Brain and a Circus Heart – 2010

Other appearances
CMJ New Music April 1997: Compilation with CMJ magazine, featuring "Our Candidate"
Achtung Autobahn (2000): Benefit compilation featuring "Peter Lorre"
Against Police Injustice (2003): Compilation featuring "Secret Service Freedom Fighting USA"
Rock Against Bush, Vol. 1 (2004): Compilation featuring "The Expatriate Act"
Fuck World Trade (2004): Album by Leftöver Crack with "Soon We'll Be Dead"
Go-Kart vs. The Corporate Giant 4 (2006): Compilation featuring a live version of "Tattoos Fade"
Hugs for Chelsea (2017): Compilation featuring "Freedom is a Wilderness"

References

External links

The World/Inferno Friendship Society's myspace
Review of "Red-Eyed Soul" on PunkNews.org
Interview with World/Inferno Friendship Society on Twilight Vision TV
World Inferno In The Studio 2009
The World/Inferno Friendship Society at BandToBand.com

1996 establishments in New York City
Punk rock groups from New York (state)
Dark cabaret musicians
Indie rock musical groups from New York (state)
Musical groups from Brooklyn
Musical groups established in 1996